Alexandre Gagné (born January 29, 1992) is a professional Canadian football fullback for the Montreal Alouettes of the Canadian Football League (CFL). He played U Sports football with the Sherbrooke Vert et Or.

Professional career

Saskatchewan Roughriders
Gagné was not selected in the 2016 CFL Draft and returned to play his final year of eligibility at Sherbrooke in 2016. He later attended a tryout camp held by the Saskatchewan Roughriders in 2017 and was signed by the team as an undrafted free agent on April 25, 2017. He began the season on the practice roster and was promoted to the active roster to play in his first professional football game on September 9, 2017 against the Winnipeg Blue Bombers in the Banjo Bowl. 

For the 2018 season, Gagné sat out the season opener, but played in the remaining 17 regular season games as he finished third in the league with 23 special teams tackles. He also played in his first post-season game in the West Semi-Final loss to the Blue Bombers that year. In 2019, he played in all 18 regular season games and had 19 special teams tackles. He became a free agent during the following off-season.

Montreal Alouettes
Gagné signed with the Montreal Alouettes on February 12, 2020. However, he did not play in 2020 as the 2020 CFL season was cancelled. In 2021, Gagné played in all 14 regular season games where he had 18 special teams tackles and one forced fumble. In the following season, he played in 18 regular season games where he had 15 special teams tackles.

References

External links
 Montreal Alouettes profile

1992 births
Living people
Canadian football linebackers
French Quebecers
Montreal Alouettes players
Players of Canadian football from Quebec
Saskatchewan Roughriders players
Sherbrooke Vert et Or football players
Sportspeople from Longueuil